Yu Xiaoguang (born 16 May 1981), also known as Ethan Yu, is a Chinese composer and actor. Yu is a former swimmer and sprint canoer. In 2006 he made a crossover from sports to films. Yu made appearances on many television series, most notably My Kung Fu Girlfriend (2006), Fighting in Peking (2009), Mao Anying (2010), The Happy Time of the Spicy and Hot Girlfriend (2012), City and Country Life (2014), and Namchow Mechanic Heroes (2015).

Early life and education
Yu was born in Dandong, Liaoning, on May 16, 1981. At the age of 7, he entered a sports school to learn to swim and later became a member of the Liaoning swimming team. In the National Youth Swimming Championships, he won the championship two years (1995 and 1996) in succession. In 1997, he started to learn to canoeing and won the championship in the National Canoeing Championships. After his early retirement, he was accepted to Central Academy of Drama, where he majored in acting. In 2002, he pursued advanced studies in Singapore, he studied music under Lee Wei Song.

Career
Yu had his first experience in front of the camera in 2006, and he was chosen to act as a lead role in My Kung Fu Girlfriend, a comedy television series starring Wang Yang and Ma Su.

In 2007, Yu made his film debut in Crazy in Love, playing Brother Xi. That same year, he  co-starred with Yao Chen and Zhang Jiayi in the historical television series Past Events.

In 2008, he appeared in the Game of Life and Death, I'm the Sun and Sailfish Qi yu.

In 2009, Yu portrayed , a writer and critic, in the war television series Fighting in Peking.

Yu portrayed Mao Anying, son of Mao Zedong, in the 2010 biographical drama Mao Anying. That same year, he had key supporting role in Mother, which starred Siqin Gaowa and Song Chunli.

In 2011, two films and one television series he headlined, Wu Yunduo, Beginning of the Great Revival and A Cheng.  He played Wu Yunduo, a Chinese ordnance expert during the Second Sino-Japanese War, in the biographical drama Wu Yunduo. He portrayed Liu Shaoqi in China Film Group and DMG Entertainment's production of Huang Jianxin and Han Sanping's Beginning of the Great Revival, alongside Liu Ye, Chen Kun, Li Qin, Huang Jue, and Liao Fan.

Yu starred in the romantic comedy television series The Happy Time of the Spicy and Hot Girlfriend, playing the boyfriend of Choo Ja-hyun's character.

In 2014, Yu portrayed Deng Zhifang, son of Deng Xiaoping, in Deng Xiaoping at History's Crossroads, created by CCTV and directed by Wu Ziniu. The drama received positive reviews and high ratings. That same year, he starred as Man Cang, reuniting him with co-star Che Xiao, who played his girlfriend Jing Mei, in the romantic television series City and Country Life. The series was one of the most watched ones in mainland China in that month.

Yu starred opposite Yu Rongguang, Choo Ja-hyun and Zhu Xiaoyu in 2015 television series Namchow Mechanic Heroes.

In 2017, Yu guest-starred on Billy Chung's Eternal Wave, an action film starring Aaron Kwok, Zanilia Zhao, Zoe Zhang, Zhang Han, and Simon Yam. That same year, he was cast in Hero, playing the son of Siqin Gaowa's and Gao Ming's characters.

Personal life
Yu married Korean actress Choo Ja-hyun on January 18, 2017. They first met while appearing in a Chinese drama The Happy Time of the Spicy and Hot Girlfriend in 2012.

On June 1, 2018, Yu's wife Chu Ja-hyun gave birth to a boy at a hospital in Seoul, South Korea.

Filmography

Film

TV series

Drama

Music video appearances

Variety show

Music (as composer)

Awards and nominations

References

External links
 
 
 Yu Xiaoguang on Douban
 Yu Xiaoguang on Mtime

1981 births
People from Dandong
Living people
Central Academy of Drama alumni
Wuhan Sports University alumni
Chinese male canoeists
Swimmers from Liaoning
Chinese male swimmers
Chinese composers
Chinese male film actors
Chinese male television actors
Chinese television directors
Film directors from Liaoning
Male actors from Liaoning